Dušan Sninský (born 7 July 1977 in Michalovce) is a Slovak footballer who currently plays for TJ Veľké Revištia.

External links 
 
 

1977 births
Living people
People from Michalovce
Sportspeople from the Košice Region
Slovak footballers
Slovakia international footballers
Slovak expatriate footballers
Association football defenders
ŠK Futura Humenné players
MŠK Žilina players
Dyskobolia Grodzisk Wielkopolski players
Slovak Super Liga players
Ekstraklasa players
Expatriate footballers in Poland
Expatriate footballers in the Czech Republic
FC Petržalka players
FC Spartak Trnava players
FK Slavoj Trebišov players
MFK Zemplín Michalovce players
MŠK Novohrad Lučenec players
Slovak expatriate sportspeople in Poland
FK Drnovice players